The Beaconhouse School System is a private school system mostly operating throughout Pakistan. It was established in November 1975 in Lahore, Pakistan as the Les Anges Montessori Academy for toddlers by Nasreen Mahmud Kasuri, wife of former Foreign Minister of Pakistan, Khurshid Mahmud Kasuri. It has now expanded in many different countries.

It also operates independent divisions in Belgium, Malaysia, Oman, Pakistan, the Philippines, Thailand, the UAE and the United Kingdom. Its activities extend beyond education in some countries.

History 
The first Beaconhouse school opened in Lahore, Pakistan, in 1975. From its initial association in the 1980s with the Moray House School of Education in Scotland, to its teacher training programme initiated in 1993 in collaboration with the University of Bradford, Beaconhouse has organised in-service teacher training.

In 1996, the World Bank Group, through its private sector wing, the International Finance Corporation, entered into a financing arrangement with Beaconhouse aimed at the construction of new school campuses.

In September 2012, the founder and chairperson of the Beaconhouse Group, Mrs. Nasreen Mahmud Kasuri, received a "Pakistan Women Power 100 award".

School network 
Beaconhouse owns school companies and educational institutes in several countries. Some of these are profiled below.

Pakistan

The first Beaconhouse school, Les Anges Montessori Academy, opened in Lahore, Pakistan, in 1975. Since then, Beaconhouse has established over 146 private schools in more than 30 cities across Pakistan. These institutions collectively provide preschool education, primary education, secondary education and preparation for the international General Certificate of Education (GCE) and local Secondary School Certificate (SSC) examinations.

Beaconhouse operates campuses for students of varying ages in the following Pakistani cities: [Bahria enclave] Abbotabad, Bahawalpur, Faisalabad, Gujranwala, Gujrat, Hafizabad, Islamabad, Jhang, Jhelum, Karachi, Kharian, Lahore, Mandi Bahauddin, Mardan, Mirpur, Multan, Nowshera, Okara, Peshawar, Hyderabad, Quetta, Rahim Yar Khan, Rawalpindi, Sadiqabad, Sahiwal, Sargodha, Sheikhupura, Sialkot, Sukkur, and Wah Cantonment.

Beaconhouse has also helped fund or manage several other educational programs in Pakistan:
 The Educators, a separate private school network
 TNS Beaconhouse, the first school in Pakistan to embrace the Reggio Emilia approach
 Gymboree Play and Music, an international franchise of play centers for which Beaconhouse is Pakistan's franchisee
 The Early Years, a child development center in Lahore, Pakistan
 Bubbles, a playgroup programme developed by Beaconhouse, offered at selected schools
 The Discovery Center Smart School in Karachi, Pakistan 
 Beaconhouse National University, a private liberal arts university in Lahore, whose establishment was assisted by a US$6 million contribution from Beaconhouse.
 Concordia Colleges, a group of college campuses established in 2014 in several cities in Pakistan

United Kingdom
Headquartered in London, Beaconhouse Educational Services Limited, or BESL, was set up by Beaconhouse as a school management company. It also serves as a holding company for Beaconhouse schools in Asia and the Middle East. BESL manages the conceptualisation and construction of start-up schools, the acquisition of existing schools, and day-to-day school operations.

BESL currently owns and operates the following schools in the UK:

 Cherub Nurseries and Preschools: Based in Yorkshire, England, Cherub is a group of three nurseries and preschools within half an hour of each other. The Cherub group was established in 1976.
 Pocklington Montessori Nursery: Pocklington Montessori Nursery is also based in Pocklington Yorkshire.
 Newlands School: Acquired by BESL in July 2009, Newlands School is an independent, coeducational day and boarding school set on a 21-acre property in Seaford, East Sussex. The school caters to students from prep school through sixth form.  In 2011, following its acquisition of Newlands UK, Beaconhouse introduced the Newlands UK Activity Programme for Classes VI to X, giving Beaconhouse students the opportunity to attend two and six-week residential trips to Newlands School.

Malaysia
The Beaconhouse School System was the first Pakistani education system to cross borders to Malaysia. Beaconhouse Malaysia Sdn Bhd was established in 2004 to operate schools in Malaysia.
Beaconhouse owns eleven schools in Malaysia, all of them in or around Kuala Lumpur. Of these, seven are preschools and four – Sekolah Sri Inai, Sri Lethia, Sri Murni and Beaconhouse-Newlands Kuala Lumpur – are primary and secondary schools.

Philippines

In late 2005, Beaconhouse acquired Dame Theresiana de Montealegre School, a private school based in Manila, Philippines, that offers English-medium education to over 200 students in an upper-middle income suburb of the city.

Beaconhouse acquired a second school, St Paul Learning Center, in Cebu City, the second largest city in the Philippines.

In early 2010, Beaconhouse International Schools entered into a partnership with Angels in Heaven School, a prestigious international school in Cabuyao, Laguna, south of Manila. Divided over two campuses located close to each other, the school caters to students at kindergarten, elementary and high school level and actively participates in activities organised with other nearby schools, such as Brent.

Thailand

In 2014, Beaconhouse entered a partnership with the Yamssard School Group, which subsequently became known as the Beaconhouse Yamsaard Schools Group. The enterprise includes three bilingual schools, and one international school. The bilingual schools, BYS Ladprao in Bangkok, BYS Rangsit in Pathum Thani, and BYS Hua Hin, offer a mix of local and premium English programmes to a predominantly Thai market, with the premium programmes being offered at an international standard.
Beaconhouse International School (BYIS) is a purpose-built international school catering to the expatriate community in Bangkok. Built on a  site close to the centre of Bangkok, BYIS currently caters to children aged 2 to 11, with plans to go up to senior school.

Indonesia
In 2010 Beaconhouse completed a strategic partnership with the SIS Group of Schools, comprising the popular Singapore International Schools (SIS) and its other national plus (private) schools. The Group has close to 3,000 students.

Bangladesh
The first branch of Beaconhouse in Bangladesh commenced its first academic year in August 2006 and relocated from Gulshan to Banani, a neighbourhood in Dhaka.

Oman
Beaconhouse established its first school in Muscat, Oman, in September 2006. This school has been established through Al-Kanz Education, a joint venture between Beaconhouse UK (which owns majority shares) and a local Omani group.

UAE

In 2009 Beaconhouse acquired the Gulf Nursery in Sharjah. The same year the Group also entered into a public–private partnership with the Abu Dhabi Education Council (ADEC) to improve the general performance of a cluster of government schools, with particular emphasis on ensuring significant improvement in students' achievement in English, mathematics and science. From September 2017, Beaconhouse Newlands school was commencing its operations in Al-Warqa, Midriff area in Dubai. The school offers the National Curriculum for England culminating in the UK qualifications IGCSE and A Levels.

TBT Online   
Launched towards the end of 2011, The Beaconhouse Times Online is an interactive news portal developed by Mudassir Ali that connects the Beaconhouse community, including parents, across 9 countries.

Alumni 

 Mir Zafar Ali, a graduate of Beaconhouse Cambridge Branch, Karachi is a visual effects specialist. Ali was the Technical Director of the team that won an Oscar for best visual effects in 2007 for the movie The Golden Compass.
 Sajal Aly, actress, graduated from Beaconhouse Lahore.
 Ayesha Omar, actress, graduated from Beaconhouse Lahore.
 Sana Askari, a TV personality and model graduated from Beaconhouse Gulshan Campus, Karachi
 Kamran Akmal, a Pakistani cricketer, graduated from Beaconhouse, Lahore
 Umar Akmal, a Pakistani cricketer, graduated from Beaconhouse, Lahore
 Salman Butt, a Pakistani cricketer, graduated from Beaconhouse Garden Town, Lahore
 Nadia Hussain, one of Pakistan's supermodels, was a student at Beaconhouse Defence Campus, Karachi.
 Hassan Sheheryar Yasin, Pakistani fashion graduated from Beaconhouse Defence Campus, Lahore.
 Ali Zafar, Pakistani actor, model and singer graduated from Beaconhouse Defence Campus, Lahore.

References

External links
 Beaconhouse Group

 
Educational institutions established in 1975
Private schools in Pakistan